Melvin Robertson (born May 25, 1928) is a former American football coach. He was considered one of the top defensive minds in football during the 1970s and 80s.

"Mad Dog" Robertson began his coaching career as an assistant under Bradley Mills at Odessa High School, before joining Bill Yeoman's staff at the University of Houston as defensive backs coach in 1965. In 1972 Emory Bellard, who had just been named Texas A&M head coach, hired Robertson as defensive coordinator. A&M was ranked No. 1 in total defense in 1975 under Robertson, who was known for his blitz packages. Robertson followed Bellard to Mississippi State in 1979.

"Melvin's got a great reputation in pro football, college football and high school football here in Texas as one of the top defensive coaches in the country," said former University of Houston Head Football Coach John Jenkins.

Robertson is retired and lives in Grapevine, Texas.

References

1928 births
Living people
American football defensive backs
Houston Cougars football coaches
Mississippi State Bulldogs football coaches
SMU Mustangs football coaches
Texas A&M Aggies football coaches
West Texas A&M Buffaloes football players
High school football coaches in Texas
People from Grapevine, Texas